The Deep Bay Marine Field Station is a marine biological research facility operated by Vancouver Island University's Centre for Shellfish Research.

Facilities include a seawater tank farm, a laboratory, a demonstration shellfish farm and a combined research facility for shellfish aquaculture, marine ecology and water quality.  The culinary program of VIU uses the kitchen facilities to prepare seafood and other dishes.  The building received the first LEED platinum rating
 among Canadian universities and a 2011 National Green Buildings Award. Located on a  site, it is accessed by a road topped with crushed oyster shells. Beetle-killed pine flooring and other BC wood products were used in construction.  It opened in 2011.

Research 
Early priorities were research concerning geoduck clams and the possibility of restoring native Olympia oysters in the area.
The goal of the facility is "supporting sustainable shellfish aquaculture development and preserving coastal ecosystems." Other prior research included creating a NextGen Shellfish Hatchery to helps supply local farmers with oyster seed.

Current research is being done on oyster broodstock conditioning.  This long-term initiative is being carried out in partnership between VIU and the BC Shellfish Growers Association.  This project is an environmental adaption initiative to address changing water conditions in Baynes Sound and the Salish Sea in general. Ocean acidification has made it more difficult for shellfish larvae to form a shell.  This has impacted wild stocks and has impacted shellfish hatcheries ability to spawn and grow shellfish.  This project is a selective breeding initiative designed to promote shellfish lines that are naturally resistant to changing environmental conditions while still maintaining a sufficiently diverse genetic base.  We hope to develop a pool of brood stock for industry that performs well in Baynes Sound and the Salish Sea.

Education 
The Deep Bay Marine Field Station also provides educational opportunities for a variety of different groups: K-12 students, VIU students and the general public.

K-12

 A childhood experience in marine sciences can be a life changing event!  We host field trips for scientists of all ages on a variety of marine science related themes. School trips can be booked here

VIU Students

 The station hosts practicums, internships, and other experiential learning opportunities for students in a variety of programs at VIU.  Most of our students are enrolled in VIU's Fisheries and Aquaculture program but opportunities are available for students in other programs to work in our algal and larval labs, plus other opportunities in analyzing data, building innovative computer operating systems, and business analysis for the shellfish aquaculture industry.

The Public

 The field station provides many learning opportunities for the public.  Aquariums and touch tanks that help to interpret the local marine environment to our visitors.  There are both guided and self-guided tours that provide interpretation on several themes along with occasional public lectures and special events. Guided tours can be booked here

References

External links

  Centre for Shellfish Research Official website
 The Deep Bay Marine Field Station
 Vancouver Island University

Vancouver Island University
2011 establishments in British Columbia
Marine biological stations
Fisheries and aquaculture research institutes
Research institutes in Canada